The WM-80 is a multiple rocket launcher formerly used by the People's Liberation Army of China and sold to other states like Armenia.

The MRL system was developed by Norinco on Chinese designed Type 83 (WM-40) 273mm. It adopts a modular design, with two launcher boxes each containing four ready-to-launch rocket rounds on a TAS-5380 8x8 truck chassis.
China newly developed WM-120-type multi-barrel rocket launcher system. The weapon system to WM-80-based development, launch tube diameter of 273 mm, with the use of solid fuel rockets, the maximum range of 120 km, the minimum range of 34 km, circular error probability of about 20 meters and equipped with global positioning systems inertial guidance device.
The system (WM-80) is now replaced by the A-100 multiple rocket launcher system.

Operators

Current operators
  - 8 vehicles bought in 1999
 
  - 24 WM-120 systems purchased from Norinco-China in 2010. (It has appeared as part of military exercises conducted by Jordanian Armed Forces)

References
 WM-80 273MM MULTIPLE LAUNCH ROCKET SYSTEM

Wheeled self-propelled rocket launchers
Self-propelled artillery of the People's Republic of China
Multiple rocket launchers
Modular rocket launchers
Military vehicles introduced in the 1990s